Jazz Bear is the mascot for the Utah Jazz, a National Basketball Association (NBA) franchise based in Salt Lake City, Utah.  Jazz Bear was introduced to the league on November 4, 1994. Since Jazz Bear's introduction, he has performed at over 800 Jazz home games. Utah Governor Gary Herbert declared October 10, 2013 as "Jazz Bear Day" in recognition of his 20th season as the Utah Jazz' mascot, and also his countless hours of community and public service and his standing as an important citizen of Utah. In 2006, Jazz Bear was inducted into the Mascot Hall of Fame. Jazz Bear has been named Mascot of the Year 5 times, and has won 8 Mascot Leadership Awards. The Bear has suffered many injuries while performing, including tearing his bicep and rupturing a tendon in his calf.

On October 19, 2018, it was reported that Jon Absey, who had performed as the Jazz Bear for twenty-four years, had been fired for unknown reasons.

References

External links
 
 The Jazz Bear at the Mascot Hall of Fame

National Basketball Association mascots
Utah Jazz
Bear mascots